Vershininskaya is a rural locality (a village) in Moseyevskoye Rural Settlement, Totemsky  District, Vologda Oblast, Russia. The population was 18 as of 2002.

Geography 
Vershininskaya is located 76 km northwest of Totma (the district's administrative centre) by road. Zharovsky Pogost is the nearest rural locality.

References 

Rural localities in Tarnogsky District